The Royal Grenada Police Force (RGPF) is responsible for law enforcement in Grenada. The RGPF enforces criminal, immigration, and maritime laws. It is also held responsible for seaport security and fire services. With 14 police stations and over 940 staff members, the force responds to over 15,000 crimes and incidents per year. The Royal Grenada Police Force also has a paramilitary force for national defense.

History
The RGPF dates back to 1853 as simply the Grenada Police Force. In 1854, the RGPF was based at Fort George, Grenada and supported by the Colonial Government of Grenada. The force grew slowly and by 1923, the police force had 92 soldiers.

During the People's Revolutionary Government's brief revolutionary era in the early 80s, the RGPF was known as the Grenada Police Service. During this period, the police lost virtually all of its authority and was forced to delegate many of its powers with the newly formed People's Revolutionary Army. Its headquarters under the leadership of Prime Minister Maurice Bishop was moved from Fort George (renamed by that time to Fort Rupert) to Melville Street on 24 May 1979.

The name was reverted and the police headquarters returned to Fort George following in October 1983 following the military coup that was led by General Hudson Austin with the United States invasion of Grenada. Prior to 1984, officers recruited into the force were trained at the Regional Police Training Centre in Barbados. 

Between the 1905–1907, the National Band of Grenada was established in the RGPF as a drum and bugle corps. It was then called the Government Band, which comprised volunteers including tradesmen. On 1 August 1967, the band was renamed RGPF band having Mr. Switch De Couteau as its first Inspector of Police as bandmaster.

Today, the RGPF is the sole law enforcement agency for the country. The RGPF is permitted up to 1,025 sworn members, however, currently only has 940 members. Approximately 14% of the force is female.

Departments 
The RGPF has 18 distinct departments with different purposes. These departments include a fire department, police headquarters, a prosecution department, immigration department, drug squad, police band, coast guard, training academy, traffic and transport department, criminal records office, criminal investigation department, community relations department, port police department, information technology unit, and a special victims unit.

Additionally, there is a department dedicated to providing security for the Government House, workplace and residence of the Governor-General of Grenada and a Special Branch for diplomatic and other governmental security.

Finally, there is a Special Services Unit for high profile cases.

Commissioners
 Stephen Bascombe (1969-1970)
 R. King (1970-1971)
 Rugent David (1971)
 R.L. Barrow (1971-1973)
 Nugent David (1973-1974)
 Osbert James (1974-1975)
 J. Usen (1975-1976)
 Osbert James (1976)
 Adonis Francis (1976)
 Osbert James (1976-1978)
 Anthony Bernard (1978)
 Osbert James (1978-1979)
 Raphael Stanislaus (1979)
 James Clarkson (1979-1981)
 A. B. Bernar (1981)
 Major Ian St. Bernard (1981)
 Major Patrick McLeish (1981-1983)
 Fitzroy Bedeau (1995-2005)

 Winston James (2015 - 2018)

 Edvin Martin (2018-Present)

See also
 Mongoose Gang, a  quasi-independent branch which operated from 1967 to 1979 under the control of Sir Eric Gairy, the Premier and later Prime Minister of Grenada, and head of the Grenada United Labour Party.

References

External links
 

Government of Grenada
Grenada